John Lee (8 May 1695 – Nov 1761), was a British politician.

He was a younger son of Sir Thomas Lee, 2nd Baronet of Hartwell House, Buckinghamshire and the brother of Sir George Lee and Sir William Lee, Lord Chief Justice.

He was the Member of Parliament (MP) for Malmesbury
(3 Jul 1747 – 1754) and for Newport (23 April 1754 – 1761).

References

1695 births
1761 deaths
Members of the Parliament of Great Britain for English constituencies
Members of the Parliament of Great Britain for constituencies in Cornwall
British MPs 1747–1754
British MPs 1754–1761
Younger sons of baronets